The Anglo-Czechoslovak and Prague Credit Bank, also known as Anglobanka, was the second-largest bank in Czechoslovakia during the 1930s. It resulted from the merger in 1930 of three Prague-based banks: 
 the Anglo-Czechoslovak Bank (also Anglobanka), created in 1922 from the former activities of Anglo-Austrian Bank in the country
 the Prague Credit Bank ( or PÚB), originally established in 1870 as Credit Bank in Kolín and relocated to Prague in 1899
 the Czech Commercial Bank, established in 1921 from the former activities of Austria's Mercurbank

Following the establishment of the Protectorate of Bohemia and Moravia, the merged entity was renamed the Anglo-Prague Credit Bank in 1939, then again Prague Credit Bank in 1940. It was nationalized in 1946 and eventually absorbed in 1948 by Živnostenská banka.

Anglo-Czechoslovak Bank

The Anglo-Austrian Bank opened a branch in Prague in 1880. Following the collapse of the Habsburg Monarchy in late 1918, more than 50% of the bank's assets were in what became Czechoslovakia and Yugoslavia, and 45 percent of its capital was held by Czechoslovak shareholders. The Bank of England soon became a major shareholder, through the mediation of the Petschek family and under direct watch of Governor Montagu Norman, and transferred the bank's head office to London. 

In 1923, the Anglo-Czechoslovak Bank opened a branch of its own in London. The Anglo-Austrian Bank, by then renamed as Anglo-International Bank, sold most of its shares in the later 1920s.

Buildings

Gočár's remodeling of the Prague head office from 1923 to 1926 was an early example of facadism. The property was purchased in 2011 by developer SEBRE, which branded it the Spork Palace after renovating it from 2014 to 2018 on an award-winning design by architect . SEBRE sold the Spork Palace to Generali in 2019.

Prague Credit Bank

The  was established in 1870 in Kolín, chaired by prominent businessman  until his death in 1879. It opened a branch in Prague in 1896, and relocated there in 1899. In 1900-1902, it built a new head office in Prague, 28. října 13, one of the earliest examples of Art Nouveau in Prague, on a design by architect  and sculpture by Celda Klouček. The Prague Credit Bank opened a branch in Lviv in 1906 then expanded outside of Austria-Hungary, with a branch in Belgrade in 1910 and another one in Sofia in 1912. In 1919, it was shored up by a group of investors led by France's Société Générale. In 1920 it took a majority stake in the Romanian Trade and Industry Bank in Bucharest; conversely, in 1921 it liquidated its branches in former Austrian Galicia.

Czech Commercial Bank

The Czech Commercial Bank was created in 1921 from the nostrification of the operations of Vienna-based Mercurbank in Czechoslovakia. It suffered heavy losses in the turmoil of the early 1920s. Given the bank's lingering fragility in the late 1920s, its directors welcomed the prospect of merger.

Merger and aftermath

In 1929, finance minister Karel Engliš, aiming to counter the dominance of Živnostenská banka, engineered the merger of the three banks to form the Anglo-Czechoslovak and Prague Credit Bank, which became the country's second-largest bank. The new bank established its head office in the former headquarters of Anglo-Czechoslovak Bank, which was the larger of the three, at Hybernská 5 in Prague. In 1939, it opened a branch in New York.

Following Nazi invasion, it was again renamed in 1939 as Anglo-Prague Credit Bank, then in August 1940 back as Prague Credit Bank. By then, it maintained international branches in Belgrade, Bratislava, Bucharest, London, New York, Paris, and Sofia, as well as in 20 locations in Bohemia-Moravia. It took over the Meatpackers and Sausage-Makers Bank (est. 1921) in December 1941, then the Czech Discount Bank (est. 1920 as ) in early 1943. Its own activity was discontinued in December 1943 and taken over by German financial institutions. In May 1945, the bank restarted operations shortly after the completion of the Prague offensive. Like all Czechoslovak banks, it was nationalized in 1946 under the Beneš decrees. It was finally subsumed in 1948 into Živnostenská banka. Its branch in New York was transferred to Živnostenská banka but eventually closed in 1949.

See also
 Anglo-Austrian Bank
 Anglo-Egyptian Bank
 Anglo-Portuguese Bank
 Anglo-South American Bank

Notes

Defunct Banks of Czechoslovakia
Banks established in 1922